Marco Biagi (24 November 1950 – 19 March 2002) was an Italian jurist. A native of Bologna, he was professor of labour law and industrial relations at the University of Modena.

In 1984 Marco Biagi was appointed Professor of Labour Law and Italian and Comparative Trade Union Law at the University of Modena, in the Department of Business Administration. From 1987 to 2002 he also served as a full professor at the Faculty of Economics.

"From 1986 to 2002 he was also Adjunct a Professor of Comparative Industrial Relations at Dickinson College, and a member of the Academic Council of the Johns Hopkins University, Bologna Center. From 1988 to 2000 he was scientific director of SINNEA International, the research and training institute of the Lega delle cooperative. In 1991 at the Department of Business Administration at Modena University he founded the Centre for International and Comparative Studies, setting up an innovative research programme in labour law and industrial relations."

In 2000, he created ADAPT — Association for International and Comparative Studies in Labour and Industrial Relations.

Biagi was assassinated by members of the Political-Military Communist Party outside his home in Bologna on 19 March 2002, due to his role as an economic advisor to Roberto Maroni, a minister in Silvio Berlusconi's government. A scholarship with his name is now offered by Johns Hopkins University for study at their overseas campus in Bologna. A square in central Bologna is named after him.

References

1950 births
Place of birth missing
2002 deaths
Italian legal scholars
Jurists from Bologna
Assassinated Italian people
People murdered in Emilia-Romagna
Deaths by firearm in Italy
Labour law scholars
Italian terrorism victims